Rasoul Mozafarivanani (born 22 July 1994) is an Iranian professional basketball player for Petrochimi Bandar Imam in the Iranian Super League as well as for the Iranian national basketball team.

Professional career
Mozafari played the 2016–17 season at the Azad University Tehran Basketball club, he averaged 4.24 points, 1.41 rebounds and 1.12 assists. In the 2017–18 season, he averaged 6.92 points, 3.08 rebounds and 1.42 assists. He moved to Naft Abadan BC in the 2018–19 season. He moved to Petrochimi Bandar Imam in the 2019 season.

National team career

Junior teams
Mozafari represented the Iranian Under 19 team at the 2013 FIBA Under-19 World Championship, he averaged 1.6 points, 0.4 rebounds and 0.3 assists.

Senior team
Mozaffari represented the Iranian national basketball team at the 2019 FIBA Basketball World Cup in China, he averaged 3 points, 0.8 rebounds and 1.3 assists. He participates in the 2021 FIBA Asia Cup qualification.

References

External links
 Asia-basket.com profile
 RealGM profile

1994 births
Living people
2019 FIBA Basketball World Cup players
Iranian men's basketball players
People from Chaharmahal and Bakhtiari Province
Petrochimi Bandar Imam BC players
Point guards
Shooting guards
Shahrdari Gorgan players